Landala is a district in central Gothenburg, Sweden with about 4,500 inhabitants (2005). Originally a traditional labour district with a large poorhouse, today Landala is home to some important educational institutes in Western Sweden, such as Chalmers University of Technology, Hvitfeldtska gymnasiet and Vasa Komvux. Also LGA has its origin in Landala.

Landala is also famous for its housing projects and social engineering in the 1960s. However, some single houses from the 19th century were spared.

References 

Gothenburg